Jill Whitlow (born November 11, 1963) is an American film and television actress who achieved her greatest recognition during the 1980s. She is best remembered by American audiences for her role as Cynthia Cronenberg in the 1986 cult horror film Night of the Creeps. She also starred in the action film  Thunder Run, which was released in 1986. And she had small roles in Porky's (1981), Mask (1985), and Weird Science (1985). She appeared on a 1984 episode of T.J. Hooker called "The Two Faces of Betsy Morgan". She also starred in the horror films Hollywood-Monster and Twice Dead. 

Whitlow appeared in the music video "Hungry" (1988) by rock band Winger.

Filmography

TJ Hooker  episode The two faces of Betsy Morgan 1984
|

References

External links

Interview with Jill Whitlow

1963 births
Living people
American film actresses
American television actresses
21st-century American women